This article lists all rail services in Rhineland-Palatinate.

Local and regional services

The services of the Rhineland-Palatinate integrated regular-interval timetable (Rheinland-Pfalz-Takt) are summarised below.
 Sections outside of the Rhineland-Palatinate are in italics.

Lines 1–9

Lines 10–19

Lines 20–29

Lines 30–39

Lines 40–49

Lines 50–59

Lines 60–69

Lines 70–79

Lines 80–89

Lines 90–99

Other lines

Stadtbahn and S-Bahn services

References

Regional rail in Germany